The Anzac biscuit is a sweet biscuit, popular in Australia and New Zealand, made using rolled oats, flour, sugar, butter (or margarine), golden syrup, baking soda, boiling water, and (optionally) desiccated coconut. Anzac biscuits have long been associated with the Australian and New Zealand Army Corps (ANZAC) established in World War I.

It has been claimed that these biscuits were sent by wives and women's groups to soldiers abroad because the ingredients do not spoil easily and the biscuits kept well during naval transportation.

Anzac biscuits should not be confused with hardtack, which was nicknamed "ANZAC wafers" in Australia and New Zealand.

Anzac biscuits are an explicit exemption to an Australian ban on commercial goods that use the term "Anzac", so long as they are sold as biscuits and not cookies.

Origins

The earliest known recipe combining the words 'anzac' and 'biscuit' is a recipe from 1916 for "ANZAC GINGER BISCUITS" which was published on June 4, 1916 in the Perth edition of The Sunday Times. However, this recipe contains no mention of oats present in modern anzac biscuits. The first recipe for something called "Anzac Biscuits" appears in an Australian publication, the War Chest Cookery Book (Sydney, 1917), but this recipe was also for a different biscuit from what we know as the modern Anzac biscuit. The same publication, the War Chest Cookery Book (Sydney, 1917), also included the first two recipes for biscuits resembling modern Anzac biscuits, under the names of "Rolled Oats Biscuits" and just "Biscuits". The first recorded instance of the combination of the name 'Anzac biscuit' and the recipe now associated with it was found in Adelaide dating to "either late 1919 or early 1920". Another early recipe for the Anzac biscuit dates back to 1921 in an Australian newspaper called The Argus. These early recipes did not contain desiccated coconut which is present in many modern Anzac biscuits. The first recipe for an Anzac biscuit containing the desiccated coconut is recorded to be from the city of Adelaide in 1924.

In 1919 in New Zealand a recipe for Anzac Crispies in the eighth edition of the St Andrew's Cookery Book had similar ingredients to modern Anzac biscuits.

Current popularity
Today, Anzac biscuits are manufactured commercially for retail sale. Because of their historical military connection with the ANZACs and Anzac Day, these biscuits are still used as a fundraising item for the Royal New Zealand Returned Services' Association (RSA) and the Returned and Services League of Australia (RSL). Special collectors old-style biscuit tins with World War military artwork are usually produced in the lead up to Anzac Day and sold in supermarkets, in addition to the standard plastic packets available all year. The official RSL biscuit is produced by Unibic under licence.

A British (though still Australian-produced) version of the Anzac biscuit, supporting the Royal British Legion, is available in several major supermarket chains in the UK.

Legal issues
The term Anzac is protected under Australian law and cannot be used in Australia without permission from the Minister for Veterans' Affairs; misuse can be legally enforced particularly for commercial purposes. Likewise similar restrictions on naming are enshrined in New Zealand law where the Governor General can elect to enforce naming legislation. There is a general exemption granted for Anzac biscuits, as long as these biscuits remain basically true to the original recipe and are both referred to and sold as Anzac biscuits and never as cookies.

Similarly to the use of the term Anzac, the Anzac biscuit is protected by regulations, regulating any commercial usage of this product so that it remains true to its traditional values. Primarily, such regulations pertain to the recipe, in which its commemorative value stems from its recipes in history, as well as the name of the product. While it is legally acceptable to substitute ingredients in a recipe to cater to dietary requirements, there is a commercial disallowance for any substantial modification of the recipe such that they deviate too far from traditional Anzac biscuit recipes. Variations of recipes posted on social media or written in cookbooks that merely include Anzac biscuits are excluded from regulations.

As a result of the aforementioned restrictions to the Anzac biscuit recipe, the Subway chain of restaurants dropped the biscuit from their menu in September 2008. After being ordered by the Department of Veterans' Affairs to bake the biscuits according to the original recipe, Subway decided not to continue to offer the biscuit, as they found that their supplier was unable to develop a cost-effective means of duplicating the recipe.

References

Biscuits
Australian snack foods
New Zealand cuisine
New Zealand desserts
New Zealand snack foods
Australian desserts
ANZAC
Foods containing coconut
Oat-based dishes